Ted Hooper (born 31 January 1991) is an American born, Taiwanese athlete specialising in the long jump. He represented Chinese Taipei at the 2016 World Indoor Championships without recording a valid mark. He also won the silver medal at the 2015 Asian Championships.

His personal bests in the event are 8.08 metres outdoors (+0.1 m/s, Irvine 2015) and 7.83 metres indoors (Seattle 2016).

He was a qualifier to the 2009 CIF California State Meet, representing Arcadia High School, where he holds the school record, but had trouble making a legal jump in the qualifying round.

Competition record

References

1991 births
Living people
People from Arcadia, California
Track and field athletes from California
Taiwanese male long jumpers
American male long jumpers